Jesus Francisco Ríos Alfaro (born May 6, 1995) is a Mexican professional baseball pitcher for the Acereros de Monclova of the Mexican League.

Career

Toronto Blue Jays
Ríos signed with the Toronto Blue Jays as an international free agent on July 20, 2012. He made his professional debut in 2013 with the Dominican Summer League Blue Jays, appearing in 15 games. In 52 innings pitched, Ríos would post a 4–6 win–loss record, 4.47 earned run average (ERA), and 48 strikeouts. In the offseason, he played with the Tomateros de Culiacán of the Mexican Pacific League. Ríos spent 2014 with the Rookie-Advanced Bluefield Blue Jays, and pitched to a 3–2 record, 5.91 ERA, and 38 strikeouts in 53 innings.

Ríos was promoted to the Short Season-A Vancouver Canadians for the 2015 season, and in 15 total appearances, posted a 3–6 win–loss record, 4.27 ERA, and 59 strikeouts in 65 innings pitched. He was assigned to the Class-A Lansing Lugnuts to open the 2016 season. In 6 starts, Ríos went 2–0 with a 1.20 ERA and 43 strikeouts in 30 total innings. He was promoted to the Advanced-A Dunedin Blue Jays on May 10. In June he was selected to play in the All-Star Futures Game. Ríos made 21 starts and four relief appearances in 2016, and pitched to a 7–6 record, 2.91 ERA, and 108 strikeouts in 120 innings. Ríos played the entire 2017 season for the Double-A New Hampshire Fisher Cats, pitching to a 3–9 record, 4.29 ERA, and 63 strikeouts in 86 total innings.

Diablos Rojos del México
On May 28, 2019, Ríos was loaned to the Diablos Rojos del México of the Mexican League.

New York Mets
On December 13, 2019, Ríos signed a minor-league deal with the New York Mets. He did not play in a game in 2020 due to the cancellation of the minor league season because of the COVID-19 pandemic. He became a free agent on November 2, 2020.

Acereros de Monclova
On May 20, 2021, Ríos signed with the Acereros de Monclova of the Mexican League.

References

External links

1995 births
Living people
Acereros de Monclova players
Baseball pitchers
Bluefield Blue Jays players
Dominican Summer League Blue Jays players
Dunedin Blue Jays players
Gulf Coast Blue Jays players
Lansing Lugnuts players
Leones del Caracas players
Mexican expatriate baseball players in Venezuela
Mexican expatriate baseball players in Canada
Mexican expatriate baseball players in the United States
New Hampshire Fisher Cats players
Sportspeople from Monclova
Tomateros de Culiacán players
Vancouver Canadians players
2019 WBSC Premier12 players